The 58th Indian Brigade was an infantry brigade of the British Indian Army that formed part of the Indian Army during the First World War.  It remained in India throughout the war.  It was not reformed for the Second World War.

History
The Headquarters 58th Indian Brigade was formed at Ahmednagar under 6th Poona Divisional Area in June 1918.  The 59th Indian Brigade was formed at the same time, presumably to command the units forming Ahmednagar at this time.  In November 1918, both brigadeswithout any unitswere transferred to the 2nd (Rawalpindi) Division.

Commander
The brigade was commanded from 25 June 1918 by Brigadier-General C.O.O. Tanner.

See also

Notes

References

Bibliography

External links
 

Brigades of India in World War I
Military units and formations established in 1918